() is a  area of land along the border between Egypt and Sudan, which is uninhabited and claimed by neither country. When spoken of in association with the neighbouring Halaib Triangle, it is sometimes referred to as the  Triangle, despite the area's quadrilateral shape; the two "triangles" border at a quadripoint.

Its  status results from a discrepancy between the straight political boundary between Egypt and Sudan established in 1899, and the irregular administrative boundary established in 1902. In 2014, author Alastair Bonnett described  as the only place on Earth that was habitable but was not claimed by any recognised government.

History

On 19 January 1899, an agreement between the United Kingdom and Egypt relating to the administration of Sudan defined "Soudan" as the "territories south of the 22nd parallel of latitude".

On 4 November 1902, the UK drew a separate "administrative boundary", intended to reflect the actual use of the land by the tribes in the region.  was grazing land used by the  tribe based near , and thus was placed under Egyptian administration from Cairo. Similarly, the  Triangle to the northeast was placed under the British governor of Sudan, because its inhabitants were culturally closer to Khartoum.

Egypt claims the original border from 1899, the 22nd parallel, which would place the  Triangle within Egypt and the  area within Sudan. Sudan, however, claims the administrative border of 1902, which would put  within Sudan, and  within Egypt. As a result, both states claim  and neither claims the much less valuable  area, which is only a tenth the size, and has no permanent settlements or access to the sea. There is no basis in international law for either Sudan or Egypt to claim both territories, and neither nation is willing to cede . With no third state claiming the neglected area,  is one of the few land areas of the world not claimed by any recognised state.

Geography

Climate

's climate is, according to the Köppen climate classification, a very hot desert climate (Bwh).

Claims

Due to its status as  unclaimed territory, a number of individuals and organizations have attempted to claim  as a micronation. However, none have been taken seriously by the international community, and due to the remoteness and hostile climate of the region, the vast majority of these claims have been by declarations posted online from other locations. None of these claims, or any others, have been recognized, officially or otherwise, by any government or international organization.

Population
Bir Tawil has no settled population, but members of the Ababda and Bishari tribes pass through the region, and unregulated mining camps have been established throughout the territory in search of gold deposits.

See also
 Egypt–Sudan border
 Egypt–Sudan relations
 Halaib Triangle, an adjoining area, claimed by both Egypt and Sudan
 Marie Byrd Land, an area in Antartica that is also a Terra Nullius
 Wadi Halfa Salient
 Liberland, a claimed micronation on a similarly unclaimed territory  on the contested Croatia–Serbia border

References

External links

 Google Sightseeing – Bir Tawil Triangle
International Boundary Study

Disputed territories in Africa
Egypt–Sudan border
Territorial disputes of Egypt
Territorial disputes of Sudan